Sonotone Corporation was a hearing aid manufacturer that was started by Hugo Leiber, inventor of the bone conduction receiver, in New York City in 1929. It was a leader in the hearing aid industry until multiple buyouts ending in 1970 led to the abandonment of the manufacturing plant. It was temporarily revived in 1987 but had closed again by 2005.

Notable models of Sonotone hearing aids include the Sonotone 1010 in 1952 with a transistor and two vacuum tubes.

By 1960, in addition to hearing aids, Sonotone manufactured nickel cadmium batteries, loudspeakers, and hand held microphones,

References 

Hearing aid manufacturers
Companies based in New York City
American companies established in 1929
American companies disestablished in 2005
Electronics companies established in 1929
1929 establishments in New York (state)